AS Lokole is a football club in Bumba, Democratic Republic of Congo.  They play in the Linafoot, the top level of professional football in DR Congo.

Achievements
Equateur Provincial League: 1
 2007

Football clubs in the Democratic Republic of the Congo
Mongala